Myanmar competed at the 2018 Asian Games in Jakarta and Palembang, Indonesia, from 18 August to 2 September 2018. Myanmar has participated in all the editions of the Asian Games except in the 1986 Games in Seoul. Volleyball player Zaw Lwin Tun, had been honored to be the flag-bearer for the country at the opening ceremony.

Competitors 
The following is a list of the number of competitors representing Myanmar that participated at the Games:

Medalists

The following Myanmar competitors won medals at the Games.

|  style="text-align:left; width:78%; vertical-align:top;"|

|  style="text-align:left; width:22%; vertical-align:top;"|

Archery 

The Myanmar team will participate in both men's and women's team. There are 6 competitors from Myanmar.

Recurve

Compound

Canoeing 

The Myanmar team participated in both men's and women's team.

Sprint

Qualification legend: QF=Final; QS=Semifinal

Traditional boat race 

Men

Women

Football 

Myanmar men's team were drawn in Group F at the Games.

Summary

Men's tournament 

Roster

Group F

Rowing 

Men

Women

Sepak takraw 

Men

Women

Shooting 

Men

Women

Mixed team

Taekwondo 

Myanmar entered the competition with 4 athletes (3 men's and 1 women's).

Poomsae

Kyorugi

Volleyball 

Myanmar men's team were drawn in Pool C at the Games.

Indoor

Men's competition

Roster
The following is the Myanmar roster in the men's volleyball tournament of the 2018 Asian Games.

Head coach: Kyaw Swar Win

Pool C

Playoffs

7th–12th quarterfinal

11th place game

Wushu 

The Myanmar wushu practitioners participated at the Games both in taolu and sanda events. Nyein Chan Ko Ko who competed in taijiquan and taijijian event clinched the first medal for the contingent after won a bronze by collecting 19.40 points.

Taolu

Sanda

Key: * TV – Technical victory.

References

Nations at the 2018 Asian Games
2018
Asian Games